OMAC (Michael Costner) is a DC Comics superhero who was introduced in OMAC #1 (July 2006).

Fictional character biography
Michael Costner, a seventeen-year-old petty thief, spent his entire life in Gotham City; first as an orphan in care of the local orphanotrophy, then scraping his life on the streets, stealing to sate his addiction to heroin.

While still at the orphanotrophy, Michael was infected with the OMAC nanovirus through a contaminated flu-vaccine shot. However, Brother Eye never activated him during the Infinite Crisis events, having lost contact with him as Michael began a life off the grid. Instead, in prevision of a victory by the metahumans, Brother Eye kept Michael as a "sleeper agent", the last unit to be activated only in times of dire need.

Brother Eye's downfall, at the hands of Sasha Bordeaux, signaled that moment. Brother Eye, now spliced between a NORAD hard drive containing the bulk of his core programming and a backup satellite orbiting the Earth, activated Michael, incidentally saving him from a round-up. The Michael-OMAC reveals himself to be problematic from the first moments of being online. While other OMACs had no personality, nor qualms about being used as killing machines, the Michael-OMAC actually rebelled against his programming upon being ordered to kill a female policewoman who was an associate and love interest of Michael. It was later hypothesized that Michael, with his personality submerged by the OMAC programming, actually relived moral imperatives and "school yard rules" from Michael's subconscious, such as "never hitting the girls".

Despite the obvious inconsistencies in his programming, Brother Eye, having no other choices, still trusted Michael to steal the hard drive from NORAD and upload it, along with part of the nanovirus source code, into the backup satellite, restarting the OMAC project at full capacity. Along the way, he was forced to battle Firestorm and Cyborg, once again pulling his punches to avoid hurting Firehawk.

Deeply resenting Brother Eye for forcing him to kill and for stealing his personality, Michael flies to outer space, taking enough control of his OMAC form to jettison the Nomac drive and the damaged Brother Eye. Enraged, Brother Eye casts him on Earth.

Vienna Barstow
While on the run, Michael met a kind showgirl, Vienna Barstow, who took an obvious interest in the young, dashing castoff, helping him escape the consequences of one of his many thefts.

Luckily, when Brother Eye later casts Michael on Earth, Vienna is traveling with her sleazy manager, Pete Rollins, and her fellow showgirls to their new job, and mistaking Michael for the victim of an ultralight aircraft accident, rushes to give him first aid.

Later that night, Vienna discovers Michael stealing from her and attempting to escape. Hoping to scare him out of his plan, she fakes a call to Las Vegas sheriffs, denouncing the earlier theft. When a truck almost runs her over, Michael is forced to use his OMAC powers to save her, incidentally revealing his ability to connect with technology. He admits to have always known Vienna was faking the call. Vienna begins to believe he is a metahuman, but, out of gratitude, she keeps helping him.

Forced by Pete to kill Michael, thereby avoiding "unnecessary" questioning for aiding a fugitive, Vienna convinces Michael to fake his death, promising to return to him later.

Meanwhile, Brother Eye rebuilds itself out of space debris. It contemplates a connection between the independence shown by Michael and his addiction to heroin; supposing the more heroin that is in Michael's system, the more control it can exert over him. Brother Eye slips into a dormant state until a motley crew of travelling drug addicts pick up Michael and, believing him in the throes of withdrawal, decide to give him a free fix.

The crew's car crashes into Pete's bus. Pete was hoping to escape the rage of his bosses who are angry at him because, being late to the next show of Vienna's équipe because of Michael, they suffered a huge monetary loss. Brother Eye is forced to activate Michael.

From the catastrophic crash emerge only four survivors: Vienna, Pete, a grievously wounded showgirl, and OMAC (Michael). OMAC mercy-kills Vienna's friend, being able to see the extent of her internal bleeding, kills Pete to prevent him from killing Vienna, and then brings Vienna to safety and reveals his identity as Michael Costner.

Able to balance his new form, Michael shows an increased control over his body, becoming able to access several OMAC powers in his human form, mostly for Vienna's benefit. At first skeptical and angry at Michael for OMAC's early doings, Vienna softens up, steadily falling in love with him. Michael squats an abandoned cabin and uses his powers to make Vienna as comfortable as he can. They share a moment of intimacy, unknowing that Brother Eye, apparently dormant since the incident with Pete, is still watching over them, planning to turn Vienna into a new, more obedient OMAC unit through the exchange of bodily fluids with Michael.

Brother Eye puts his plan into fruition by hampering Michael's activities with a wave of hallucinations and shutting down Vienna's body during a raid by the local police, arresting both of them as squatters. Michael manages to free himself, but too scared to actively fight Brother Eye, he keeps feigning a catatonic state while Brother Eye rebuilds Vienna's now comatose body to peak health.

Elsewhere, Batman notices strange activities in space and sends Superman to search for Brother Eye. Superman is captured by Brother Eye and held in a kryptonite-laced chamber. He manages to contact Michael, transmitting him Brother Eye's plans about Vienna and the world: to kill all of Earth's metahumans to avenge its defeat; and ultimately smash the Earth and the Moon together, thus ending a "corrupt" humanity. Moreover, Vienna is now pregnant with Michael's son.

Hoping to stop Michael from garnering enough courage to make a stand, Brother Eye awakens Vienna, now an OMAC, and sends her to kill Michael, knowing he will refuse to access his full powers to avoid being controlled by Brother Eye. Michael shocks Vienna into control by telling her of her pregnancy and reminding her about their previous charade. Once again, Vienna fakes Michael's death, before returning to human form and expressing fear for her child.

Michael reassures her and asks her to remain on Earth; since, only by focusing on her safety can he avoid becoming a thrall of Brother Eye again. He then sets off for a final stand.

Final battle
Michael returns to space for a showdown with Brother Eye, freeing Superman to assist him.

As Brother Eye gains the upper hand, Vienna once again takes the matter into her own hands. Faking absolute subservience to Brother Eye, she hurls herself over the atomic furnace alimenting Brother Eye, utterly destroying it.

Michael returns to Earth, mourning his dead companion and his unborn child. No longer a fugitive, but a revered hero, thanks to a flattering article by Clark Kent, he reveals to the planet that he fears for a return of Brother Eye. Prophetically, a small monitor in space activates, showing the distinctive Brother Eye icon.

Countdown and beyond 
The cover for Countdown #51 (first issue) shows an OMAC among the characters assembled. Michael Costner takes no part in the story.

Michael's status as "the last OMAC unit" is questioned as Brother Eye is shown to be able to rebuild, effortlessly, an OMAC armada by assimilation of human soldiers and Apokolips parademons, apparently negating his need for a "last unit" to restore to him his source code. It may, however, be inferred that Buddy Blank, its early programmer, restored the entirety of its code while trying to restore it to its normal operating parameters, making it again able to control and activate OMACs.

A captive, amnesiac OMAC is acquired by Batman during his last tenure with the Outsiders and is brainwashed into total obedience. It is later destroyed, though, making a moot point if he was intended to be an amnesiac Costner or a simple construct.

Furthermore, during the Final Crisis events, Mister Terrific is able to reach several humans infected with the OMAC virus, putting Brother Eye in charge of fighting the Justifiers on the behalf of humanity. Their presence may contradict Michael's (and Vienna's) status as "the last and most necessary OMAC unit standing", unless they were infected with the virus in later events.

Powers and abilities
Before being depowered, Michael had shown the fullest abilities of every other OMAC before him. He was able to access the extensive knowledge on metahumans stored by Brother Eye, shapeshift parts of his body accordingly, and enlarge his body mass.

At first completely unconscious, his main personality was submerged under the OMAC main program. A unique set of circumstances later gave Michael full control of his abilities. Shortly before being depowered by Brother Eye's destruction, he could retain his invulnerability, heat vision, and partial shapeshifting abilities even in human form. He could turn his limbs into tools or weaponry partly covered in OMAC armor; or, simply, into giant, enlarged OMAC body parts.

The OMAC virus can be transmitted through the exchange of body fluids, such as during sexual intercourse. However, any newly infected individuals (e.g., Vienna Barstow) would still need to be "activated" by Brother Eye before they could access their OMAC powers. While infected with the OMAC virus, Vienna expressed the very same abilities as Michael.

There is no known cure for the OMAC nanovirus, but EMP disruption can put the infection into "remission". Thus, until the creation of a new breed of OMAC cyborgs during the Countdown events, Michael was still the last OMAC and he can still spread the infection, though he is unable to access his powers. This assumption, presumably due to bad communication between Grant Morrison, author of the Final Crisis series, and the authors involved in Countdown to Infinite Crisis and the OMAC miniseries, is again debunked when Mister Terrific, in his role as head of Checkmate, reveals that the former OMACs still retain their powers and manages to activate millions of them at once with the help of Brother Eye's lingering code.

References

DC Comics superheroes
DC Comics male superheroes
DC Comics characters with superhuman strength
DC Comics characters who are shapeshifters
DC Comics orphans
DC Comics cyborgs
Fictional criminals
Comics characters introduced in 2006